Sankeerthanam Pole is a 1997 Indian Malayalam-language film,  directed by Jeassy. The film stars Murali, Geetha, Rekha, Captain Raju and K. B. Ganesh Kumar. The film has musical score by Johnson. This was Jeassy's last film as director.

Cast

Murali as Kunjachan
Geetha as Achamma
Rajan P. Dev as Mathayi/Mathachan
Rekha as Joyamma George
Baiju as Georgekutty Mathew
Sadiq as Ravi
Captain Raju as Father Zakariya
K. B. Ganesh Kumar as Vijayan
Mala Aravindan as Varkky
Maathu as Thulasi Ayyappan
 Bindu Panicker as Suzy Mathew
 Thrissur Elsy as Salamma George
Prof. Aliyar as N.K. / Narayanan Kutty
Lishoy in Cameo Appearance
K.P.A.C. Sunny in Cameo Appearance
Kanakalatha in Cameo Appearance
Sankaradi in Cameo Appearance
Pradeep Varapuzha in Cameo Appearance

Soundtrack
The music was composed by Johnson.

References

External links
 

1997 films
1990s Malayalam-language films